Admiral Lazarev was the second . Until 1992 she was named Frunze after a Project 68 cruiser (named after Bolshevik leader Mikhail Frunze); at that time she was renamed after Russian admiral Mikhail Petrovich Lazarev. Scrapping of the ship began in April 2021.

Construction and design 
She was laid down on 27 July 1978 at Baltiysky Naval Shipyard, Leningrad, launched on 26 May 1981, and commissioned on 31 October 1984.

Differences from lead ship 
Admiral Lazarev was constructed differently from the lead ship of the class. On the forward part of the ship, the twin SS-N-14 ASW missile launcher was replaced with 8 octuple SA-N-9 surface-to-air missile vertical launchers (planned, but not installed). On the aft part, a single twin AK-130 130 mm gun, similar to the guns used on Slava and Sovremennyy, was used instead of two 100 mm guns. Near the flight deck, the 30 mm CIWS cannons were moved to the aft superstructure and replaced with place for 8 octuple SA-N-9 vertical launchers (not installed). There were also some differences in the sensors, ESM/ECM suite and communication systems.

Career 
In August to November 1985 she sailed from the North via the Cape of Good Hope and the Malacca Strait to join the Soviet Navy's Pacific Fleet. She visited Luanda, Aden, and Vietnam along the way. Holm writes that the ship only conducted local-waters training from 1987 to 1992, and was inactive from 1994 onwards.

In 1999 the cruiser was taken out of service and prepared for scrapping as no money was available for its overhaul. In 2004–2005 the cruiser's nuclear fuel was unloaded. 

As of 2009 it was reported that the ship was moored near Vladivostok, in conservation status. The Russian Navy planned to modernize the ship and return it to active service, provided that the necessary funds were found. In 2012 it appeared unlikely modernization would occur, as the ship was "considered to be beyond repair... will be scrapped, a source in the military complex says". 

Admiral Lazarev has appeared in aerial imagery from 2006 to 2014 moored in the Abrek Bay mothball fleet, near Fokino, Primorsky Krai. In northern summer 2014, Admiral Lazarev was painted at "30 судоремонтного завода" (roughly 30th Ship Repair Factory) in the Chazhma Bay drydock to extend preservation time in the reserve fleet. The latest aerial imagery shows the ship located at 42°55'46.0"N 132°25'08.0"E in the Bukhta Abrek.

In April 2019, Russia decided to scrap and recycle the Admiral Lazarev in 2021. A contract for ship recycling was signed in February 2021.

Updated scrapping photos were posted in October 2021.

References 

Kirov-class battlecruisers
Cold War cruisers of the Soviet Union
1981 ships
Nuclear ships of the Soviet Navy
Ships built at the Baltic Shipyard